Marquess Xian of Zhao (died 409 BC) or Zhao Xianzi was a leader of the State of Zhao during the Warring States period (475-220 BC) of ancient China.

Born Zhào Huàn, he was the son of Zhao Zhou, grandson of Zhao Bolu and the eldest brother of Zhao Xiangzi.

Zhào Xiāngzĭ believed that it was illegal for him to be the successor to Zhào Bólŭ and wanted to return his inheritance so that Zhào Huàn would become heir apparent.

After Zhào Huàn became leader he was banished from the Zhao capitals of Zhongmu County (in modern-day Henan) and Dai Commandery (near modern-day Yuzhou in Hebei) by Zhao Huanzi, who usurped Zhào Huàn's position and installed himself as ruler.

A year later, Zhào Huánzĭ died and the local people killed all his sons. As a result, Zhào Huàn once more became leader of Zhao. After he died he was awarded the posthumous title of Zhào Xiànzĭ whilst his son became Marquess Lie of Zhao who subsequently altered his father's posthumous title to Marquess Xian of Zhao.

References
Shen Changyun, “Zhao State Historical Manuscripts”, Zhonghua Publishing

Monarchs of Zhao (state)
Zhou dynasty nobility
5th-century BC Chinese monarchs
Zhao (state)
409 BC deaths